The 12th Aerobic Gymnastics World Championships were held in Sofia, Bulgaria 1 to 3 June 2012.

Results

Women's Individual

Men's Individual

Mixed Pairs

Trios

Groups

Dance

Step

Team

Medal table

References

FIG official site
Official results

World Aerobic Gymnastics Championships
Aerobic Gymnastics World Championships
Aerobic Gymnastics
International gymnastics competitions hosted by Bulgaria